This is a list of things named after George Biddell Airy, a 19th-century mathematician and astronomer.

Mathematics and related physics concepts

 Airy beam
 Airy condition
 Airy disc
 Airy distribution
 Airy differential equation
 Airy functions Ai(x) and Bi(x) 
 Airy points.
 Airy stress functions
 Airy transform
 Airy wave theory.
 Airy zeta function

Astronomy and geosciences
 Airy–Heiskanen model, see "Airy hypothesis". 
 Airy, a crater on Mars. 
 Airy-0, another smaller crater, whose location within Airy, defines the prime meridian of that planet.
 Airy (lunar crater) named in his honour.
 Airy ellipsoid
 Airy hypothesis
 Airy Mean Time
 Airy projection
 Airy Transit Circle

Other
 Airy (software)

References

Airy
Airy